Semenenko (Cyrillic: Семененко) is a surname. It may refer to:

 Artem Semenenko (born 1988), Ukrainian footballer
 Evgeni Semenenko (born 2003), Russian figure skater
 Piotr Semenenko (1814–1886), Polish theologian
 Semyon Semenenko (born 1981), Russian footballer
 Serge Semenenko (1903–1980), Ukrainian-American banker
 Yevhen Semenenko (born 1984), Ukrainian triple jumper

See also
 

Ukrainian-language surnames